Philippa Thomas (born 22 November 1965) is a television newsreader and journalist, both domestic and foreign, at the BBC and a chief news presenter at BBC World News, presenting evening bulletins on BBC News Channel and BBC World News. She is currently presenter of Coronavirus: Your Stories on BBC World News and the BBC News Channel. She is also a life coach.

Early life and education
She was raised in Wakefield, West Yorkshire, the daughter of an English teacher and an air force pilot and attended a state comprehensive. Thomas joined University College, Oxford to study English Literature in 1984, she switched to Philosophy, Politics and Economics and Islamic Studies a year later.

Career
After graduating from university with a double first, Thomas gained a place on the BBC News Trainee scheme. Of the final eight, she was the only woman. Thomas has reported extensively from the United States, South America, Africa, and continental Europe. She was posted as presenter and special correspondent in the BBC Washington bureau from 2007 to 2010, where she anchored political coverage, and filmed original features on U.S. politics, economics and culture. Her stories aired on BBC World News, PBS news broadcasts, BBC America's World News America, and BBC Online.

Before that, during 2007 and 2008, Thomas presented the 22:00 ET edition of World News Today, a one-hour news programme on the BBC World News and BBC News. From 1997 to 2001, she was also a BBC North America correspondent, providing headline news from the impeachment of President Clinton to the global impact of the 9/11 attacks. From 1990 to 1997, she was a BBC Political Correspondent reporting from Westminster, Belfast and Dublin, including extensive coverage of the Northern Ireland peace process.

While a Nieman Journalism Fellow (2010–2011) at Harvard University, studying digital media and citizen journalism, a blog post by Thomas reporting a comment by P.J. Crowley received wide coverage, and resulted in Crowley's resignation. She returned to her BBC broadcast duties in July 2011. Since returning to the UK Thomas has appeared as a correspondent on BBC News.

Since January 2013, Thomas has been a full time presenter on the relaunched BBC World News, first as the main presenter of World News Today. She is also an occasional presenter of The World Tonight on BBC Radio 4 and Newshour on the BBC World Service.

Thomas is a special elections presenter for BBC World Service, anchoring rolling news coverage of UK and US elections since 2015.

In 2018, Thomas made a cameo appearance as herself in Jurassic World: Fallen Kingdom.

On 24 July 2021, Thomas presented the BBC One Weekend News Evening and Late bulletins for the first time.

In September 2021, in the aftermath of Taliban takeover of Afghanistan, Thomas was accused of biased reporting by anti-Pakistani activist Christine Fair.

References

External links 

BBC Press Office biography 
 Her blog

1965 births
BBC World News
BBC newsreaders and journalists
BBC television presenters
British journalists
Living people
People from Wakefield
Alumni of University College, Oxford